Frank McLoughlin (born 1 August 1946) is a former Irish politician. He was an unsuccessful candidate at the 1977 and 1981 general elections. He was elected to Dáil Éireann as a Labour Party Teachta Dála (TD) for the Meath constituency at the November 1982 general election. He lost his seat at the 1987 general election.

References

1946 births
Living people
Labour Party (Ireland) TDs
Local councillors in County Meath
Members of the 24th Dáil
People from County Meath